David Oswald Edwards "Ossie" Jones (15 August 1909 – 2002) was a Welsh footballer who played in the English Football League for Wrexham, Nottingham Forest, Macclesfield Town, Tranmere Rovers, Watford and Crewe Alexandra

References

1909 births
People from Ruabon
Sportspeople from Wrexham County Borough
2002 deaths
Welsh footballers
Wrexham A.F.C. players
Nottingham Forest F.C. players
Macclesfield Town F.C. players
Tranmere Rovers F.C. players
Watford F.C. players
Crewe Alexandra F.C. players
English Football League players
Oswestry Town F.C. players
Southport F.C. players
Aberystwyth Town F.C. players
Association football inside forwards